"All in the Mind" is a song by the English rock band the Verve. It was released as the band's first single in the United Kingdom on 9 March 1992. "All in the Mind" and its B-sides "One Way to Go" and "A Man Called Sun" were recorded at Blue Bell Hill Studios in Kent, England in November 1991 with producer Paul Schroeder.

Inspiration for the song and chart performance 
On its release, the song immediately topped the independent charts, as did their following two singles, "She's a Superstar" and "Gravity Grave". The song, however, made very little headway into the mainstream charts. Just like the early Verve performances, the music had huge psychedelic connections and references in the lyrics, such as
"I was born to fly, fly, pretty high."

Track listings
 CD HUTCD 12 
 All in the Mind
 One Way to Go
 Man Called Sun 
 7" HUT 12 
 All in the Mind
 One Way to Go
 12" HUTT 12 
 All in the Mind
 Man Called Sun
 One Way to Go

Video
The video for the song was recorded in the flat of its director, Miles Aldridge, in London E1. The song shows the band playing in a dark, hazy room, with a dark blue light in the background. Various band members are seen pushed up against a bare wall.

References

External links 
 Music video

All in the Mind
1992 debut singles
Hut Records singles
1992 songs
Songs written by Nick McCabe
Songs written by Richard Ashcroft
Songs written by Simon Jones (musician)
Songs written by Peter Salisbury